Planes: Fire & Rescue (also known as Planes 2: Fire & Rescue) is a 2014 American 3D computer-animated comedy-adventure film produced by Disneytoon Studios and released by Walt Disney Pictures. It is a sequel to the 2013 film Planes, a spin-off of Pixar's Cars franchise. Dane Cook, Stacy Keach, Brad Garrett, Teri Hatcher, Danny Mann, and Cedric the Entertainer reprised their roles of the voices of Dusty Crophopper, Skipper, Chug, Dottie, Sparky, and Leadbottom, respectively. New cast members included Hal Holbrook, Julie Bowen, Ed Harris, Regina King, Wes Studi, Patrick Warburton, and Dale Dye. In this film, Dusty Crophopper is assigned to become a wildland firefighting plane, after he learns that his engine's gearbox is damaged.

Planes: Fire & Rescue premiered at the El Capitan Theatre in Los Angeles on July 15, 2014, and was theatrically released on July 18, 2014, in Disney Digital 3D, RealD 3D and D-BOX formats. The film received mixed reviews from critics, with many calling it an improvement over its predecessor, and grossed $147 million worldwide on a $50 million budget.

Plot

Since winning the Wings Around the Globe Rally, Dusty Crophopper had a successful career as a racer. Unfortunately, his engine's gearbox becomes damaged because Dusty routinely operates the engine beyond its design limits. With that particular model of gearbox now out of production and none available anywhere, Dusty's mechanic Dottie fits a warning light to his control panel to ensure that he doesn't overstress it further.

Unable to race and faced with the possibility of returning to his old job as a crop duster, Dusty goes on a defiant flight and tests his limits. In doing so, Dusty is forced to make landing at Propwash Junction airport, causing a fire. The residents put out the fire with some difficulty, but the accident leads government inspector Ryker to condemn the airport for inadequate firefighting protocols. Aggrieved at his actions, Dusty offers to undergo training to be certified as a firefighter for the airport's reopening.

The next day, Dusty travels to Piston Peak National Park, where he meets a fire and rescue crew under the command of a helicopter named Blade Ranger. The leader of an efficient unit, Blade is initially unimpressed by the small newcomer and Dusty's training proves to be a difficult challenge.

Maru, the team's mechanic, replaces Dusty's original undercarriage with two pontoons fitted with retractable undercarriage wheels for his new role as a single engine air tanker firefighter. From other crew members, Dusty learns that Blade was formerly an actor who played a police helicopter on the TV series CHoPs but left for unknown reasons. Later, Dusty is devastated by a call from his friends at Propwash Junction, telling him that they've failed to find a replacement gearbox, meaning that his racing career is over.

Lightning in a thunderstorm over a forest near Piston Peak starts several spot fires which unite into a serious forest fire. The team fights it and seems to have extinguished it; but later, during the grand reopening of the park's lodge, visiting VIPs fly too low and create air eddies that blow embers about. This creates a larger fire, forcing the need to evacuate the lodge.

A depressed Dusty's education in the midst of the large fire falters, much to Blade's frustration. Things come to a head when Dusty makes a forced landing in a river while trying to reload his tanks against orders and is swept through the rapids with Blade trying to extract him. Eventually, the pair make it to land, and Dusty confesses his physical disability. Blade advises Dusty not to simply give up. They shelter in an abandoned mine while the fire passes. Blade was severely damaged, airlifted and grounded for repairs. Maru tells Dusty that Blade's co-star Nick "Loopin' " Lopez from CHoPs was killed during a stunt gone wrong on set that Blade was helpless to stop. Blade became a firefighter to save lives for real.

When the wildfire threatens the lodge, the national park's superintendent Cad Spinner selfishly diverts the entire water supply to the roof sprinklers to prevent the lodge from burning, which prohibits the team from fire suppression. With only their pre-existing tank loads, the firefighters instead manage to help the evacuees escape the fire.

Dusty is alerted that two elderly campers named Harvey and Winnie that he met earlier are trapped on a burning bridge deep in the fire zone. He races to the scene and pushes his engine to the maximum to climb vertically up a waterfall for a refill, as the only other water source is simply inadequate. Simultaneously, Blade shows up and assists Harvey and Winnie by hooking up Winnie, preventing her from falling. Dusty successfully eliminates the bridge fire, allowing the campers to escape just before it collapses. Dusty's gearbox blows out, and he crashes.

Unconscious, Dusty is airlifted back to base where he wakes up five days later to find that park ranger Jammer has replaced Cad. Maru tells him that not only has his structure been fully repaired but he has built a superior, custom-refurbished gearbox for his engine that allows Dusty full performance once again. Impressed at Dusty's skill and heroism, Blade certifies him as a firefighter. Propwash Junction is reopened with Dusty assuming his duty as a firefighter, celebrated with an aerial show with his new colleagues from Piston Peak.

A mid-credits scene reveal Cad was fired and became a Death Valley National Park ranger.

Cast

Production
According to director/co-writer Roberts "Bobs" Gannaway, "The first film [directed by Klay Hall] was a race film. I wanted to look at a different genre, in this case, an action-disaster film." Production on Planes: Fire & Rescue began six months after the start of the previous film. "We've been working on this film for nearly four years." The filmmakers researched the world of air-attack teams and smokejumpers by working with the California Department of Forestry and Fire Protection, and sent a crew to the US Forest Services' annual training exercises for smokejumpers. Gannaway explained "We actually hooked cameras onto their helmets and had them drop out of the airplane so we could catch it on film." Nearly a year of research was done before the filmmakers started work on the story. The idea of Dusty becoming a fire and rescue plane was based on reality. Gannaway stated that during their research they discovered that in 1955 cropdusters were among the first planes to be used in aerial fire-fighting, "There was a group of cropdusters who reworked their planes so they could drop water." Gannaway also noted that in the first film "Dusty is doing things to his engine that should not be done to it—he is stressing the engine out and causing severe damage. It's great that the first movie teed this up without intending to. We just built on it, and the results were remarkable." Producer Ferrell Barron stated "I think we've all experienced some kind of loss at some point in our lives—an end of an era, a lost love, a failed career. We've all had to recalibrate. In Planes: Fire & Rescue, Dusty can't go back to being a crop duster, he left that behind. He has to move forward." Prana Studios provided work on visual effects, animation and compositing.

A pre-release screening of the film was conducted at the 2014 National Native Media Conference, where screenwriter Jeffrey M. Howard and art director Toby Wilson joined actor Wes Studi in Q & A to discuss the Native American themes in the film. They noted that the character of Windlifter, and the folkloric story he tells of how Coyote was renewed by fire, was developed in consultation with Dr. Paul Apodaca, an expert on Native American myths and folklore.

Release
Planes: Fire & Rescue was released on July 18, 2014. The second official trailer for the film was released on April 8, 2014. The film's premiere was held at the El Capitan Theatre in Los Angeles on July 15, 2014.

Home media
Planes: Fire & Rescue was released by Walt Disney Studios Home Entertainment on DVD and Blu-ray on November 4, 2014. Blu-ray bonus features include the exclusive six-minute animated short film Vitaminamulch: Air Spectacular, directed by Roberts Gannaway, in which Dusty and Chug participate in an air show disguised as absent stunt planes Air Devil Jones and Vandenomium. Additional material includes a mockumentary called Welcome to Piston Peak!, a CHoPs TV promo, a featurette called Air Attack: Firefighters From The Sky; a behind-the-scenes look at real smokejumpers and firefighters plus making of the film with director Roberts Gannaway and producer Ferrell Barron, a music video of "Still I Fly" by Spencer Lee, two deleted scenes with filmmaker intros, and two animated shorts introducing Dipper and the Smokejumpers.

As of November 30, 2014, it has sold 639,436 DVD units and 478,129 Blu-ray units, totaling $20,142,246. It was ranked number 7 in the United States Combined DVD and Blu-ray Sales Chart.

Reception

Critical response
The site's consensus reads: "Although it's too flat and formulaic to measure up against the best family-friendly fare, Planes: Fire and Rescue is a passable diversion for much younger viewers". On Metacritic, the film has a score of 48 out of 100, based on 29 critics, indicating "mixed or average reviews". Audiences polled by CinemaScore gave the film an average grade of "A" on an A+ to F scale.

Todd McCarthy of The Hollywood Reporter gave the film a mixed review, saying "Beautiful to look at, this is nothing more than a Little Engine That Could story refitted to accommodate aerial action and therefore unlikely to engage the active interest of anyone above the age of about 8, or 10 at the most." Justin Chang of Variety gave the film a positive review, saying "There are honestly stirring moments to be found in the movie's heartfelt tribute to the virtues of teamwork, courage and sacrifice, and in its soaring 3D visuals." Stephen Whitty of the Newark Star-Ledger gave the film two and a half stars out of four, saying "There are enough silly jokes and simple excitement here ... to keep the youngest ones interested, and a few mild puns to occasionally make the adults smile." Alan Scherstuhl of The Village Voice gave the film a negative review, saying "There's a fire. And a rescue. And lots of static, TV-quality scenes that drably cut from one car or plane to another as they sit in garages and discuss the importance of believing in yourself." Soren Anderson of The Seattle Times gave the film two and a half stars out of four, saying "Disney's Planes: Fire & Rescue isn't half bad. Kids should enjoy it and their parents won't be bored." Sara Stewart of the New York Post gave the film two out of four stars, saying "It's generic stuff, unless you're a kid who's really into playing with toy planes and trains and cars." Stephan Lee of Entertainment Weekly gave the film a B, saying "Canny references to '70s television and some genuinely funny moments will give grown-ups enough fuel to cross the finish line." A.A. Dowd of The A.V. Club gave the film a C−, saying "It's nice to look at, easy to watch, and impossible to remember for the length of a car-ride home."

Joe Williams of the St. Louis Post-Dispatch gave the film two and a half stars out of four, saying "Without the kindling of character development, Planes: Fire and Rescue is no smoldering success, but if Disney's flight plan is to share Pixar's airspace, it's getting warmer." Peter Hartlaub of the San Francisco Chronicle gave the film two out of four stars, saying "It's not a poor movie. But it's definitely a better movie for the kids." Claudia Puig of USA Today gave the film two out of four stars, saying "With the lackluster quality of its characters - aircraft, a smattering of trucks, RVs and motorcycles - the movie makes Pixar's Cars and its sequel look like masterpieces." Colin Covert of the Star Tribune gave the film three out of four stars, saying "There are a scattering of inside gags, asides and blink-and-you-missed-it details for the parents. The film's focus, though, is pleasing the milk-and-cookies crowd." Mark Feeney of The Boston Globe gave the film two and a half stars out of four, saying "Most DisneyToons releases are direct-to-video. That lowly status shows here in the pokey storytelling, dreadful score, and generally tired comedy." Kenneth Turan of the Los Angeles Times gave the film a positive review, saying "What this Disney feature lacks in the title department it makes up for with fluid visuals and fast-moving action of the, yes, firefighting variety." Linda Barnard of the Toronto Star gave the film two and a half stars out of four, saying "For the most part, Planes: Fire & Rescue is more about chuckles than big guffaws, coupled with thrilling 3-D flight and firefighting action scenes and lessons about friendship, respect and loyalty." Ben Kenigsberg of The New York Times gave the film a mixed review, saying "In 3-D, the firefighting scenes are visually striking - with plumes of smoke and chemical dust - though the backgrounds, like other aspects of the film, lack dimension."

Bill Zwecker of the Chicago Sun-Times gave the film three out of four stars, saying "Planes: Fire & Rescue is a good improvement over Planes, which Disney released last year. The story is stronger, there are some wonderful additions to the voice talent and the 3D cinematography is well-utilized." James Rocchi of The Wrap gave the film three out of four stars, saying "As it is in the merchandising aisle, so it is on the big screen: Planes: Fire and Rescue is precisely long, competent, and entertaining enough to be sold, and sold well." David Hiltbrand of The Philadelphia Inquirer gave the film one and a half stars out of four, saying "The animation in Planes: Fire & Rescue is considerably better, the landscapes grander, and the 3-D flight and firefighting scenes more exciting. But you get the same lame puns wedged into a succession of situations, rather than a story." Jordan Hoffman of the New York Daily News gave the film two out of five stars, saying "The meek action plays to the under-10 crowd, but the groaner puns will play only to masochists. Meanwhile, the 3-D ticket upcharge here is a big ripoff - the extra dimension is unnecessary." Lisa Kennedy of The Denver Post gave the film a positive review, saying "Vivid and folksy, Fire & Rescue nicely exceeds expectations dampened by last summer's stalled-out Planes." Catherine Bray of Time Out gave the film one out of five stars, saying "Displaying a weird lack of memorable or endearing characters, this animated effort feels more like a direct-to-video job from the 1990s than a fully fledged John Lasseter–exec-produced theatrical release."

Box office
Planes: Fire & Rescue grossed $59.2 million in North America, and $92.1 million in other countries, for a worldwide total of $151.1 million. In North America, the film earned $6.29 million on its opening day, and opened to number three in its first weekend, with $17.5 million, behind Dawn of the Planet of the Apes and The Purge: Anarchy. In its second weekend, the film dropped to number five, grossing an additional $9.5 million. In its third weekend, the film dropped to number six, grossing $6 million. In its fourth weekend, the film dropped to number ten, grossing $2.5 million.

Soundtrack

Mark Mancina, who composed the music for the first film, returned for the sequel. In addition, Brad Paisley wrote and performed a song for the film titled "All In". Paisley also performed a song titled "Runway Romance", co-written by Bobs Gannaway and Danny Jacob. Spencer Lee performed an original song titled "Still I Fly". The soundtrack album was released on July 15, 2014.

 Track listing

Video game
A video game based on the film, titled Disney Planes: Fire & Rescue, was released on November 4, 2014, for Wii, Nintendo 3DS, and Wii U and was published by Little Orbit.

Cancelled sequel and spin-offs

In July 2017, during the D23 Expo, John Lasseter announced that a third film in the Planes series was in development. The film, tentatively titled Beyond the Sky, was to explore the future of aviation in outer space. The film had a release date of April 12, 2019. On March 1, 2018, it was removed from the release schedule. On June 28, 2018, shortly after the announcement that Lasseter would leave Disney by the end of the year, Disneytoon Studios was shut down, ending development on the film.

Before its closure, Disneytoon Studios also had several other films set in the Cars world on various stages of development. Their plans included films based on trains and boats. In November 2022, concept art for one of the proposed films, tentatively titled Metro, leaked online.

References

External links

2014 films
2014 3D films
3D animated films
2014 computer-animated films
2010s adventure comedy films
2010s American animated films
2010s fantasy comedy films
2010s sports comedy films
American adventure comedy films
American aviation films
American children's animated adventure films
American children's animated comedy films
American children's animated fantasy films
American computer-animated films
American fantasy comedy films
American sequel films
American sports comedy films
Animated films about aviation
Cars (franchise)
DisneyToon Studios animated films
2010s English-language films
Film spin-offs
Films about firefighting
Films about wildfires
Walt Disney Pictures films
2014 comedy films
Films scored by Mark Mancina
Films directed by Bobs Gannaway
Aerial firefighting